Hard Luck is a 1921 American two-reel silent comedy film starring Buster Keaton, written and directed by Keaton and Edward F. Cline. It runs 22 minutes. For sixty years it was Keaton's only major lost film until it was partially reconstructed in 1987, with the critical final scene—which Keaton called the greatest laugh-getting scene of his career—still missing. It was later discovered in a Russian archive print, and now the full film is available.

Plot
Buster plays a down-on-his-luck young man who decides to commit suicide after losing his job and his girl. After several inept attempts to end his life—and bolstered by whiskey disguised as poison—he joins an expedition to capture an armadillo. He finds himself becoming more confident through a series of adventures (such as fishing and fox hunting) as the film proceeds. But the confidence becomes his undoing as he misses the pool in a dive from a high board and hits the ground on the far side with such force that he disappears into a hole. Some years later, an Asian-garbed Buster climbs out of the hole in the now dry and deserted pool followed by a Chinese wife and three young children.

Cast
 Buster Keaton – Suicidal Boy
 Virginia Fox – Virginia
 Joe Roberts – Lizard Lip Luke
 Bull Montana – Virginia's husband (uncredited)

See also
 Buster Keaton filmography
 List of American films of 1921
 List of rediscovered films

References

Bibliography

External links

 
 
 
 Hard Luck  at the International Buster Keaton Society

1921 films
1921 comedy films
1920s English-language films
Films directed by Buster Keaton
Films directed by Edward F. Cline
American black-and-white films
American silent short films
Films produced by Joseph M. Schenck
Films with screenplays by Buster Keaton
Articles containing video clips
1920s rediscovered films
1921 short films
American comedy short films
Silent American comedy films
Rediscovered American films
1920s American films